Ribosomal protein L36a like is a protein that in humans is encoded by the RPL36AL gene.

Function

Cytoplasmic ribosomes, organelles that catalyze protein synthesis, consist of a small 40S subunit and a large 60S subunit. Together these subunits are composed of 4 RNA species and approximately 80 structurally distinct proteins. This gene encodes a ribosomal protein that is a component of the 60S subunit. The protein, which shares sequence similarity with yeast ribosomal protein L44, belongs to the L44E (L36AE) family of ribosomal proteins. This gene and the human gene officially named ribosomal protein L36a (RPL36A) encode nearly identical proteins; however, they are distinct genes. Although the name of this gene has been referred to as ribosomal protein L36a (RPL36A), its official name is ribosomal protein L36a-like (RPL36AL). As is typical for genes encoding ribosomal proteins, there are multiple processed pseudogenes of this gene dispersed through the genome. [provided by RefSeq, Jul 2008].

References